Thomas à Beckett (1836–1919) was an Australian solicitor and judge.

Thomas a Beckett or Becket may also refer to:

 Thomas Becket or à Becket (1119/20–1170), murdered Archbishop of Canterbury, Roman Catholic and Anglican saint and martyr
 Thomas Turner à Beckett (1808–1892), lawyer and politician in Victoria, Australia
 Thomas A'Becket (composer) (1808–1890), American composer 
 St Thomas à Becket Catholic Secondary School, Wakefield, West Yorkshire, England
 Thomas A Becket Junior School, a primary school in Worthing, West Sussex, England

abeckett, Thomas